Elena Alexeevna Yakovleva (born 5 March 1961) is a Soviet and Russian actress known for her roles in such films as Intergirl and Encore, Once More Encore! as well as for the main role in the popular TV-series Kamenskaya.

She is a long-term actress in the Moscow Sovremennik Theatre. In 2002, Yakovleva was awarded the title People's Artist of Russia. Laureate of the State Prize of Russian Federation in the field of literature and art in 2000. She was awarded the Order of Honour (2006).

Biography
After graduating from high school, Yakovleva was admitted to one of the leading theaters in Moscow, the Sovremennik Theatre. In 1986, she proposed to go to the Moscow Drama Theater named after M.N. Yermolova - a theater located in Moscow.

Selected filmography

References

External links 

  Official Website 
 

1961 births
Living people
People from Zviahel
Soviet film actresses
Soviet television actresses
Soviet stage actresses
Russian film actresses
Russian television actresses
Russian stage actresses
Soviet actresses
20th-century Russian actresses
21st-century Russian actresses
People's Artists of Russia
Academicians of the Russian Academy of Cinema Arts and Sciences "Nika"
State Prize of the Russian Federation laureates
Honored Artists of the Russian Federation
Recipients of the Order of Honour (Russia)
Recipients of the Nika Award
Russian Academy of Theatre Arts alumni